The South West India Championships was a combined men's and women's tennis tournament , founded in 1949. The championships were played in Cochin and Trivandrum,  Kerala, India. The championships ran until 1970 before they was discontinued.

History
Tennis was introduced to India in 1880s by British Army and Civilian Officers.  In 1949 the South West India Championships were founded in Trivandrum,  Kerala, India. The championships ran until 1970 before they was discontinued.

References

Clay court tennis tournaments
Defunct tennis tournaments in India